"I Believe You" is a love ballad composed by Don and Dick Addrisi which was a 1977 single for Dorothy Moore; taken from her self-titled Dorothy Moore album. "I Believe You" reached #5 R&B and crossed over to the US Pop Top 30 at number 27. The track also reached number 20 in the UK.

Carpenters cover
The song was recorded by the Carpenters and released as a single in June 1978. While it reached number 9 on the Billboard Adult Contemporary chart, it peaked at a disappointing #68 on the Billboard Hot 100, owing significantly to the fact that its accompanying album was delayed indefinitely (it would be three more years until their next album was released), reportedly due to Karen's health issues, although Richard at the time was also dealing with his own addiction to quaaludes.

In June 1981 the album Made in America—which included "I Believe You"—was finally released. The potential success "I Believe You" might have had it been issued in conjunction with an LP was underscored when the album's eventual lead single, "Touch Me When We're Dancing", became the first Carpenters hit to reach the Hot 100's Top 20 as well as number 1 on the Billboard Adult Contemporary chart since "There's a Kind of Hush" did the same in early 1976.

Personnel
Karen Carpenter – lead and backing vocals
Richard Carpenter – backing vocals, piano, Fender Rhodes electric piano, celesta, vocal arrangements
Joe Osborn – bass
Larrie Londin – drums
Tim May – acoustic and electric guitars
Jerry Steinholtz – congas
Uncredited - bell tree, flute, oboe, shaker, triangle
Paul Riser - orchestration

Chart history
Dorothy Moore

The Carpenters

Other cover versions
"I Believe You" was also featured on the 1978 album Moods by Barbara Mandrell.

References

1977 songs
1977 singles
1978 singles
Dorothy Moore songs
The Carpenters songs
Malaco Records singles
A&M Records singles